Philip Dougherty Tavern, also known as the Humphreyville Hotel, is a historic inn and tavern located in East Fallowfield Township, Chester County, Pennsylvania. It is directly across the road from the Philip Dougherty House.  It was built about 1778, and is a two-story, six bay, stuccoed stone structure with a gable roof.  The Marquis de Lafayette stopped for lunch at the tavern on his grand tour in 1825.

It was added to the National Register of Historic Places in 1985.

References

Hotel buildings on the National Register of Historic Places in Pennsylvania
Hotel buildings completed in 1778
Buildings and structures in Chester County, Pennsylvania
National Register of Historic Places in Chester County, Pennsylvania